The 2017–18 season is Club Olimpo's 6th consecutive season in the top-flight of Argentine football. The season covers the period from 1 July 2017 to 30 June 2018.

Current squad
.

Out on loan

Transfers

In

Out

Loan in

Loan out

Friendlies

Pre-season

Mid-season

Primera División

League table

Results by matchday

Copa Argentina

References

Club Olimpo seasons
Olimpo